Gladiator: Son of Spartacus is the third book in the Gladiator Series, by Simon Scarrow.

Plot summary 
Marcus Cornelius Primus has been freed from slavery, and wants to find and rescue his mother. Meanwhile, his former master Caesar wants him to help defeat the rebellious slaves led by Brixus.

Style
The Gladiator series is intended for young teens and older, with a targeted age group of 11 years old and up. The story is quite clear, fast and without excessive details. The frequent action scenes are described very precisely and graphically.

External links

References

2013 British novels
Gladiator (novel series)
Novels set in the 1st century BC
Penguin Press books